Camp Anawanna may be:
 Camp Anawanna, fictional camp featured in the early-1990s Nickelodeon children's television series Salute Your Shorts
Camp Anawanna (Pennsylvania), a Laurel Highlands Council Boy Scout camp in Western Pennsylvania
Kutsher's Camp Anawana near Monticello, New York
Camp Anawanna, a band from Denton, TX